Reen Yu (born October 22, 1987) is a Taiwanese actress and model.

Biography
Yu is currently studying in Fu Jen Catholic University, department of philosophy. While she attended high school, she appeared in many music videos and commercials. In 2009, she took on a small role in the Taiwanese television series Black & White. Her outstanding performance in the series and received a good response from netizens.

Filmography

Television series

Music videos

Movies

References

External links
 Reen Yu's Facebook.
  Reen Yu's Sina Weibo 微博

1987 births
Living people
Taiwanese television actresses
Fu Jen Catholic University alumni